Emms is a surname.

Notable people with the name include:

 Carl Emms (born 1966), British radio presenter and disc jockey
 David Emms (1925–2015), English educationalist and rugby player
 Gail Emms (born 1977), English badminton player
 Hap Emms (1905–1988), Canadian ice hockey player and coach
 John Emms (disambiguation), several people
 Mitchel Emms, British contestant on The Voice UK in 2013
 Robert Emms (born 1986), English actor
 William Emms (1930–1993), Australian school teacher and screenwriter
 Winifred Emms (1883–1972), English entertainer

See also 
 EMMS (disambiguation)